The Jefferson Historic District in the town of Jefferson, Marion County, Texas is a collection of numerous historic buildings including 56 of state significance at the time of its nomination.  The district encompasses 107 acres of the southeastern portion of central Jefferson, and was added to the National Register of Historic Places on March 31, 1971. The district contains numerous Recorded Texas Historic Landmarks including the Marion County Courthouse that is also a State Antiquities Landmark. Many buildings are also documented in the Historic American Buildings Survey.

Contributing properties
Listed below are some noteworthy contributing properties located within the district.

Atkins House
Rowell-DeWare Home
Sagamore
Marsh Place
Guardian Oak (Lester House)
Knightwood
Falling Leaves (Koontz-Amoss Home)
Todd-Terhune Residence
Alice Emmert House
Figures House
Presbyterian Church
Schluter Home
Brown Building
Jefferson Public Library - A Carnegie library built in 1907
Kahn Saloon
Thurman Place

Gallery

See also

National Register of Historic Places listings in Marion County, Texas
Recorded Texas Historic Landmarks in Marion County

References

External links

Jefferson, Texas
Historic districts on the National Register of Historic Places in Texas
National Register of Historic Places in Marion County, Texas